Njurunda SK is an ice hockey team in Njurunda, Sweden. They play in the Swedish Division 2, the fourth level of ice hockey in Sweden. Their home arena is the Njurunda ishall, which opened in 1986. Henrik Zetterberg used to play for the club's youth team.

Njurunda had previously played in the third-level Division 1, but elected to drop out of the league during the 2012-13 season, following the conclusion of the Division 1B continuation series.

References

External links
Official website
Team profile on eurohockey.com

Ice hockey teams in Sweden
Ice hockey teams in Västernorrland County